The 1694 Siege of Huy or Second Siege of Huy took place during the Nine Years' War between 22 September and 27 September 1694. The campaign of 1694 started rather late in the year. The French limited themselves to defending what they already had and William III first wanted to await the outcome of the expedition to Brest. The Anglo-Dutch amphibious assault was a failure. 2000 of the 7000 allies died in the assault. At the same time William III was gathering the Anglo-Dutch army at Leuven. End July he reviewed the troops there and they were in excellent condition. The Anglo-Dutch army was reinforced by 6,000 Bavarian troops in pay of Spain and numbered 84,000 men in total. The allies possessed the numerical advantage so the French remained on the defensive. When this became clear to William III he send the Duke of Holstein Plön and Menno van Coehoorn with an army to take the city of Huy. 5 days later on 27 September, the French garrison surrendered. The 780 remaining defenders of the original 1200 were allowed to march out with the honours of war. William III felt that enough had been achieved this year: the allies didn't have to keep as many troops on garrison duty in Liége and the Meuse was again in allied hands up to Namur. It also allowed him to plan for the siege of Namur the next year.

Sources

Huy
Huy
Huy
Huy
Wars_involving_Spain